A by-election was held for the New South Wales Legislative Assembly electorate of Central Cumberland on 17 December 1868 because of the resignation of Allan Macpherson, who left the colony to return to Europe.

Dates

Result

Allan Macpherson resigned.

See also
Electoral results for the district of Central Cumberland
List of New South Wales state by-elections

References

1868 elections in Australia
New South Wales state by-elections
1860s in New South Wales